This is a list of lakes of the Indian state of Uttar Pradesh.

Gallery 

 
U
Lists of tourist attractions in Uttar Pradesh